Lewis Askey (born 4 May 2001) is a British cyclist, who currently rides for UCI WorldTeam .

Major results

Cyclo-cross

2017–2018
 Junior National Trophy Series
2nd Derby
2nd Abergavenny
2018–2019
 2nd National Junior Championships
 UCI Junior World Cup
2nd Grand Prix Eric De Vlaeminck
 Junior Brico Cross
2nd Grand Prix Rouwmoer
 Junior DVV Trophy
3rd Azencross
 3rd Hasselt
2021–2022
 National Trophy Series
1st Derby

Road

2018
 1st Paris–Roubaix Juniors
 2nd Road race, National Junior Road Championships
 2nd La Philippe Gilbert Juniors
 5th E3 Harelbeke Junioren
2019
 1st  Overall Junior Tour of Wales
 1st  Overall Isle of Man Youth Tour
1st Stage 1
 2nd Gent–Wevelgem Junioren
 3rd Trofee van Vlaanderen
 4th Guido Reybrouck Classic
 5th Overall 
2020
 10th Paris–Tours Espoirs
2021
 1st Stage 2 Ronde de l'Isard
 2nd Gran Premio di Poggiana
 National Under-23 Road Championships
2nd Road race
4th Time trial
 National Road Championships
3rd Circuit race
5th Road race
 5th Road race, UCI Road World Under-23 Championships
 8th Overall Kreiz Breizh Elites
2022
 2nd Road race, National Under-23 Road Championships
 2nd Classic Loire Atlantique
2023
 5th Nokere Koerse

Track
2019
 1st  Madison (with Alfie George), National Junior Track Championships

References

External links

2001 births
Living people
English male cyclists
British male cyclists
People from Cannock